Turtle's Progress is a British television series, created by Edmund Ward and broadcast between 1979 and 1980.  The offbeat humour of the show attracted a small but cult audience, and the show ran for two series. The theme music was written and sung by Alan Price.

Background
The characters of Turtle and Razor Eddie had first appeared in 1975 in The Hanged Man, also created by Edmund Ward.

In early 2011, the entire series was released on DVD by Network On Air.

Plot
The series was an ITV ATV Drama and dealt with a petty criminal named Turtle (played by John F. Landry) and his minder, "Razor" Eddie (Michael Attwell), who by accident come into possession of the proceeds of a major bank robbery. Eddie had been told to steal a van, and the van he stole turned out to be the getaway vehicle for the robbery. Inside were a large number of safe deposit boxes. Each episode of the show dealt with Turtle and Eddie opening one box and dealing with its contents. Part of the humour came from the interplay between Turtle and Superintendent Rafferty, who knew they did the crime, had no evidence on which to act, but lurked about in hope of a break.

Cast

 John F. Landry – Turtle
 Michael Attwell – Razor Eddie Malone
 Ruby Head – Aunt Ethel Wagstaff
 Tony London – George Wagstaff
 Terry Kinsella - Jason
 James Grout –Superintendent Rafferty (Series 1 only)
 David Swift – Superintendent Rafferty (Series 2 only)
 Tony Melody – Colour Sergeant Arnold
 Leueen Willoughby – Miss Anthea Goodliffe
 Paul Shane - Mashcan

External links

1979 British television series debuts
1980 British television series endings
1970s British comedy-drama television series
1980s British comedy-drama television series
ITV television dramas
British comedy-drama television shows
Television series by ITV Studios
Television shows produced by Associated Television (ATV)
English-language television shows